

A
Alexandre Adler
Charles-Robert Ageron
Maurice Agulhon
Henri Amouroux
Claire Andrieu
Michel Antoine
Daniel Arasse
Philippe Ariès
Robert Aron
Denise Artaud
Philippe A. Autexier
Jean-Pierre Azéma

B
Jean-Louis Bacque-Grammont
Paul Bairoch
Françoise Balibar
Bernard Barbiche
Colette Barbier
Jean-Pierre Bardet
Dominique Barthélémy
Marc-Olivier Baruch 
Nicolas Baverez
Françoise Bayard
Colette Beaune
Annette Becker
Jean-Jacques Becker
François Bédarida
Lucien Bély
Yves-Marie Bercé
Jean-François Berdah
Nicole Bériou
Jacques Berlioz
Carmen Bernand
Mathias Bernard
Serge Berstein
Marie-Claude Blanc-Chaléard
Marc Bloch
François Bluche
Frédéric Bluche
Pascal Bonafoux
Jacques-Olivier Boudon
Philippe Boutry
Frédéric Bozo
Raphaëlle Branche
Fernand Braudel
Pierre Briant
Catherine Brice
Pierre Broué
Denis Buican
Philippe Burrin

C
Patrick Cabanel
Olivier Carré
Hélène Carrère d'Encausse
André Castelot
Michel de Certeau
Jean-Pierre Chaline
Nadine-Josette Chaline
Olivier Chaline
Roger Chartier
Christophe Charle
Pierre Chaunu
Jacques Chiffoleau
Alain Corbin
Joël Cornette
Robert Cornevin
Stéphane Courtois
Denis Crouzet
François Crouzet
Elisabeth Crouzet-Pavan

D
Jacques Dalarun
Alain Decaux
Jean-Pierre Dedieu
Robert Delort
Laurence des Cars
Marcel Détienne
Jean Doise
Jean-Luc Domenach
François Dosse
Bernard Droz
Jacques Droz
Georges Duby
Georges Dumézil
Françoise Dunand
Jacques Dupâquier
Jean-Baptiste Duroselle

Christian-Jacques Ehrengardt
Christiane Éluère
Alain Erlande-Brandenburg

F
Dominique Farale
Alexandre Farnoux
Sébastien Fath
Jean Favier
Marc Ferro
André Fontaine
Alain Forest
Geneviève Fraisse
Robert Frank
Jacques Frémeaux
François Furet

G
Max Gallo
Alain Garrigou
Jean Garrigues
Emilio Gentile
Pierre Gerbet
Raoul Girardet
René Girault
Pierre Grosser
Serge Gruzinski
Pierre Guillaume

H
Philippe Hamon
Mohamed Harbi
Daniel Hémery
Guy Hermet
François Hinard
Gabrielle Houbre
Anne Hugon

Jean Imbert

J
Jean Jacquart
Jean-Noël Jeanneney
Stanislas Jeanesson
Arlette Jouanna

K
André Kaspi
Basile Kerblay
Simon Kitson
Annie Kriegel

L
Etienne de la Vaissière
Pierre Laborie
Jean Lacouture
Fabrice Laroulandie
Henry Laurens
Marc Lazar
Jacques Le Goff
Daniel Lefeuvre
Jean-Loup Lemaître
Emmanuel Le Roy Ladurie
Nicole Lemaître
Philippe Levillain
Pierre Lévêque
Bernard Lewis
Claude Liauzu
Yann Le Bohec

M
Jean Maitron
Martin Malia
Jean-Jacques Marie
Henri-Irénée Marrou
Jacques Marseille
Albert Mathiez
Jean-Marie Mayeur
Pierre Mélandri
Hélène Miard-Delacroix
Marie-José Michel
Pierre Milza
Philippe Minard
Pierre Miquel
Claudia Moatti
Philippe Moreau Defarges
Jean-Marc Moriceau
Joël Morin
Claude Mossé
Michel Mourre
Jean-François Muracciole

N
Claude Nicolet
Gérard Noiriel
Pierre Nora
Yves-Henri Nouailhat

O
Jean-Marc Olivier
Pascal Ory
 Jacques Ozouf
Mona Ozouf

P
Michel Pastoureau
Sylvie Patin
Guy Penaud
Jean-Christian Petitfils
Michelle Perrot
Guy Pervillé
Olivier Pétré-Grenouilleau
Pierre Pierrard
Charles Pietri
Luce Pietri
Hervé Pinoteau
Raymond Poidevin
Philippe Poirrier
Léon Poliakov
Jacques Portes
Alice Poulleau
Antoine Prost

Bernard Ravenel
René Rémond
Pierre Renouvin
Jacques Revel
Serge Ricard
Pierre Richet
Jean-Pierre Rioux
Yannick Ripa
Louis Robert
Daniel Roche
Philippe Robrieux
Marcel Roncayolo
Henry Rousso
Anthony Rowley
Olivier Roy
Odile Rudelle

S
Gisèle Sapiro
Jean-François Sirinelli
Alain-Gérard Slama
Albert Soboul
Jean-François Solnon
Pierre Sorlin
Zeev Sternhell
Benjamin Stora

T
Alain Tallon
Laurent Theis
Georges Tate
Guy Thuillier
Emmanuel Todd
Tzvetan Todorov
Jean Touchard
Pierre Tucoo-Chala
Jean Tulard

Justin Vaïsse
Maurice Vaïsse
Pierre Vallaud
Odon Vallet
André Vauchez
Marc Venard
Jean-Pierre Verdet
Jean-Pierre Vernant
Paul Veyne
Pierre Vidal-Naquet
Georges Vigarello
Michel Vovelle
Pierre de Vaissière

W
Jean Watin-Augouard
Nicolas Werth
Annette Wieviorka
Olivier Wieviorka
Michel Winock

Charles Zorgbibe

See also
 List of historians
 List of French historians

French